Isaac Norton Rendall (September 30, 1825 – November 15, 1912) was an American Presbyterian minister and academic administrator. He served as president of Lincoln University for forty-one years (1865–1906).

Early life and education

Isaac Norton Rendall was born in Utica, New York on September 30, 1825. He had five siblings. He graduated from Princeton University in 1852 and from Princeton Theological Seminary in 1855 and received his ordination as a Presbyterian minister in 1860. He subsequently received a doctorate of divinity from Lafayette College in 1870. He served as stated supply first of the church of Oneida Valley, New York, from 1858 to 1864 and of the church of Emporium, Pennsylvania, from 1864 to 1865.

Lincoln University presidency

Rendall became president of the Ashmun Institute, later renamed Lincoln University after the assassination of Abraham Lincoln, in 1865. He lived on campus at the University. Upon retirement in 1906, he was the longest serving university president in the world, having served for forty-one years. Lincoln University had also become one of the wealthiest colleges in the country. Over the decades, he had rejected four petitions from Philadelphia's free Black community to hire qualified African American faculty. Following his retirement, he continued to live on campus and teach evangelism and polemics at the school.

Later life and legacy

Rendall never married. In late October 1912, he became sick and died on November 15, 1912 at his home on the campus of Lincoln University. He is buried at Oxford Cemetery in Oxford, Pennsylvania. In the week subsequent to his death, the Public Opinion called him a "friend of negro[s]" in an obituary due to his work at Lincoln University.

Legacy

Rendall Hall at Lincoln University is named for him and his nephew John Ballard Rendall, who also served as president of the university. His records are held in the Cooperative HBCU Archival Survey Project, including a book he wrote about Lincoln University.

References

External links

1825 births
1912 deaths
Presidents of Lincoln University (Pennsylvania)
19th-century Presbyterian ministers
20th-century Presbyterian ministers
American Presbyterian ministers
Deaths in Pennsylvania
Burials in Pennsylvania
Lincoln University (Pennsylvania) faculty
Princeton University alumni
People from Utica, New York